Micropterix maschukella is a species of moth belonging to the family Micropterigidae. It was described by Sergei Alphéraky in 1870. It is found in Armenia and the Crimean Peninsula.

References

Micropterigidae
Moths described in 1870
Insects of Turkey